Klaus Hartmann (born in 1969 in Eisleben) is a German painter living in Berlin.

After serving his apprenticeship as an orthopedic shoemaker in Erfurt Klaus Hartmann studied from 1991 to 1997 at the University of Fine Arts of Hamburg with Werner Büttner. In 1994, he spent a semester abroad at the Academy of Fine Arts Vienna.

Work

The paintings of Klaus Hartmann are picturesque constructions that originate from the artist's detailed observations. Frequently, he integrates thematic breaks into his pictures that may be interpreted as reflections on society. Early painting themes are garden plots, fairs, Ferris wheels and roller coasters, billboards, rails, pedestrian bridges, different formations of bushes and Chinese restaurants, among others.

Klaus Hartmann travelled to East Africa several times. Between 2006 and 2015, he painted a series of Tanzania paintings that consist predominantly of landscapes. The series of drawings "Along the New Road" has been created since 2016. The series is a collection of typical buildings found in rural areas of Tanzania, Rwanda and Zambia. The viewer slips into the role of a driver who glimpses houses, huts and kiosks as they drive past. The landscape is fictional.

Collections

Paintings by Klaus Hartmann are included in many private and museum collections including the Bundeskunstsammlung (The Federal Collection of Contemporary Art), Kunstmuseum Dieselkraftwerk Cottbus (Art Museum Cottbus), Kunstmuseum Bremerhaven (Art Museum Bremerhaven) and The Falckenberg Collection in Hamburg.

Books

Jürgen Becker (ed.) Klaus Hartmann: Jua Toka and The Source of Shades - The Tanzania Paintings, Textem-Verlag, Hamburg 2015, Text Fritz W. Kramer, 

Jürgen Becker (ed.) Klaus Hartmann: Candy Station, Textem-Verlag, Hamburg 2017,

References

External links

German male painters
20th-century German painters
20th-century German male artists
German contemporary artists
1969 births
Living people
21st-century German painters
21st-century German male artists
University of Fine Arts of Hamburg alumni
Artists from Berlin
German landscape painters